Gravelton is an unincorporated community in Elkhart and Kosciusko counties, in the U.S. state of Indiana.

History
Gravelton was platted in 1876. The name likely refers to the presence of a gravel pit. A post office was established at Gravelton in 1876, and remained in operation until it was discontinued in 1906.

Geography

References

Unincorporated communities in Elkhart County, Indiana
Unincorporated communities in Kosciusko County, Indiana
Unincorporated communities in Indiana